Sabine Kahle (born 25 June 1959 in Meiningen) is a retired German swimmer who won two silver medals in medley events at the 1977 European Aquatics Championships. She also participated in the 1976 Summer Olympics and finished fifth in the 400 m medley and eighth in the 400 m freestyle.

References

1959 births
Living people
German female swimmers
Olympic swimmers of East Germany
Swimmers at the 1976 Summer Olympics
European Aquatics Championships medalists in swimming
German female medley swimmers
People from Meiningen
Sportspeople from Thuringia